Die Konsequenz (The Consequence) is a 1977 West German made for television film directed by Wolfgang Petersen. The screenplay is an adaptation of the 1975 autobiographical novel of the same name by Alexander Ziegler. The film premiered on ARD on 8 November 1977.

Plot 
Gay actor Martin Kurath (Jürgen Prochnow) who is in prison develops a friendship with Thomas Manzoni (Ernst Hannawald), the 15-year-old son of the prison warden (Lüönd). The two fall in love and they both yearn for Kurath's release. This triggers intense indignation in their surroundings. After Kurath is released a year later, Thomas, accompanied by Kurath, tells his parents he is a homosexual. His father tells him to leave and never return. Kurath and Thomas move in together and Thomas enrolls in school. Thomas' father, however, then has him arrested and condemned to a brutal reformatory. Kurath obtains a fake passport and poses as a psychology doctoral candidate and helps Thomas escape with him to Germany. They are betrayed by a German homosexual friend of Kurath's who insists, in Kurath's absence, that Thomas become his lover in order to obtain a German residency permit. Thomas does so, but then refuses to sleep with the betrayer, is kicked out and prostitutes himself. Broken by these experiences, he voluntarily returns to the reformatory. When he reaches 21 and is released, he is so psychologically damaged that, despite reunion with Kurath, he attempts suicide and is committed to a psychiatric hospital. He escapes and the film ends with a TV announcement that the police are looking for him and that the public should, if approaching him, treat him gently, as he is very depressed and confused.

Literary original 
The novel Die Konsequenz, which reads like the diary of Martin Kurath, is set in 1974. The Swiss Alexander Ziegler processed his personal experiences in the book. He himself served two and a half years in prison for "seducing an innocent underaged person to unnatural sexual acts".

Film production 
Alexander Ziegler contributed personally in the collaboration of Bernd Eichinger's 1977 adaptation of the novel and with the director Wolfgang Petersen. Die Konsequenz was made-for-television and filmed in black and white on 16 mm film. The soundtrack is composed by Nils Sustrate.

In March 2008, the film was released on DVD as part of a complete works edition of director Wolfgang Petersen's films (size: 22 DVDs).

Controversy 
The original version of the film received a Wertvoll (i.e. "recommended") quality award in the German Filmprädikat rating scheme, but was censored due to its perceived incendiary content in the first television broadcast on ARD on November 8, 1977, and regional affiliate Bayerischer Rundfunk refused to relay the transmission signal.

The novel and film had a pivotal role in West Germany in starting a dialogue on the topic of homosexuality, a role analogous to that played by the works of Roger Peyrefitte in France.

Reviews

Awards 

 Adolf Grimme Awards 1977

Literature 
 Alexander Ziegler: Die Konsequenz. , Fischer-TB 3407, Frankfurt am Main, 1978
 Wolfgang Petersen and Ulrich Greiwe (editors): Die Resonanz. Briefe und Dokumente zum Film "Die Konsequenz" , Fischer-TB 3423, Frankfurt am Main, 1980

References

External links 
 
  gay-web.de
  www.deutsches-filmhaus.de

1977 films
1977 television films
1977 LGBT-related films
Gay-related films
German LGBT-related films
West German films
German television films
1970s German-language films
German-language television shows
German black-and-white films
Censorship in Germany
Films based on Swiss novels
Films set in Switzerland
Films produced by Bernd Eichinger
Films directed by Wolfgang Petersen
Television shows based on Swiss novels
Grimme-Preis for fiction winners
1970s German films
Das Erste original programming